The Große Steinau is a river of Lower Saxony, Germany.

It is a  tributary of the Sieber, north of Herzberg am Harz in the district of Göttingen. It rises at about 690 metres near the crags of the Sophienklippe on the Acker. It initially flows in a southwesterly direction, but later swings south before discharging into the Sieber near the small settlement of Aschenhütte, not far from the mouth of the Kleine Steinau. In times of drought the water of the Große Steinau seeps completely into the karst ground before its mouth and reappears about 4 days later at the Rhume Spring. An abandoned village, Steynowe, was probably located in the lower valley of the Große Steinau, but its exact location has not been found.

See also 
List of rivers of Lower Saxony

Sources 
Topographische Karte 1:25000, Nr. 4228 Riefensbeek
Topographische Karte 1:25000, Nr. 4328 Bad Lauterberg im Harz
Topographische Karte 1:25000, Nr. 4327 Gieboldehausen

References

External links
Steinau valley at karstwanderweg.de (German)
The Lüderholz on the Große Steinau at karstwanderweg.de (German)

Rivers of Lower Saxony
Rivers of the Harz
Göttingen (district)
Rivers of Germany